After Office Hours is a 1935 crime drama film directed by Robert Z. Leonard and starring Clark Gable and Constance Bennett.  The screenplay was written by Herman Mankiewicz.

Plot
Jim Branch (Clark Gable), a newspaper editor, falls for wealthy socialite Sharon Norwood (Constance Bennett), after having fired her as a reporter, all while trying to solve a murder mystery.

Cast
 Constance Bennett as Sharon Norwood 
 Clark Gable as James "Jim" Branch 
 Stuart Erwin as Hank Parr 
 Billie Burke as Mrs. Norwood 
 Harvey Stephens as Tommy Bannister 
 Katharine Alexander as Julia Patterson 
 Hale Hamilton as Henry King Patterson 
 Henry Travers as Cap 
 Henry Armetta as Italian diner owner 
 Charles Richman as Jordan 
 Herbert Bunston as Barlow, Norwood's butler 
 Margaret Dumont as Mrs. Murchison
 William Demarest as police detective
 Rita La Roy as Branch's Society Girlfriend

Box office
According to MGM records the film earned $759,000 in the US and Canada and $522,000 elsewhere resulting in a profit of $492,000.

References

External links 

 
 
 
 

1935 films
1935 crime drama films
American black-and-white films
American crime drama films
Metro-Goldwyn-Mayer films
Films directed by Robert Z. Leonard
Films about journalists
Films with screenplays by Herman J. Mankiewicz
1930s English-language films
1930s American films